Dove Mountain is a master-planned community located in Marana, Arizona, about 40 minutes outside of Tucson and in the foothills of the Tortolita Mountains. The area gets its name from the mountain range near which it is located, the Tortolita Mountains.  The word tortolita means "little turtle dove" in Spanish, hence Dove Mountain.

The community is best known for playing host to the WGC-Accenture Match Play Championship at Ritz-Carlton Golf Club. A Ritz-Carlton hotel and resort opened in the community on December 18, 2009, along with a Jack Nicklaus-designed golf course. The community, which includes The Residences at The Ritz-Carlton, Dove Mountain is the largest Ritz-Carlton branded development in the continental United States.

Del Webb at Dove Mountain is a 45+ Active Adult community, featuring a variety of single-story home designs to choose from. At the center of the community is the Saguaro Recreation Center, featuring a state-of-the-art fitness center, resort-style pool and spa, and sport courts.

References

Planned communities in Arizona